is a train station in the city of Saku, Nagano, Japan, operated by East Japan Railway Company (JR East).

Lines
Tatsuokajō Station is served by the Koumi Line and is 62.1 kilometers from the terminus of the line at Kobuchizawa Station.

Station layout
The station consists of one ground-level side platform serving a single bi-directional track.  The station is unattended.

History
It was elevated to a full passenger station on 1 September 1934. The station was closed from 1944 to 1952. It was renamed to its present name on its reopening on 1 March 1952. With the dissolution and privatization of JNR on April 1, 1987, the station came under the control of the East Japan Railway Company (JR East).

Surrounding area
Tatsuoka Castle,  a nearby star fort.

See also
 List of railway stations in Japan

References

External links

 JR East station information 

Railway stations in Nagano Prefecture
Railway stations in Japan opened in 1915
Stations of East Japan Railway Company
Koumi Line
Saku, Nagano